James Livingston Thomson (March 15, 1828 –  July 2, 1897) was an American entomologist who specialised in Coleoptera.

James Thomson was of independent means and for most of life lived in France. His collection of  Cerambycidae,  Buprestidae, Cetoniinae and Lucanidae was eventually sold to René Oberthür 
He was a Member of the Société entomologique de France.

James Thomson is not to be confused with Carl Gustaf Thomson (1824–1899) also an entomologist.

Works
Partial list:

1857 Monographie des Cicindélides, ou exposé méthodique et critique des tribus, genres et espèces de cette famille par James Thomson Paris :J.-B. Baillière,1857 
1858 Voyage au Gabon. Histoire naturelle des insectes et des Arachnides recueillis pendant un voyage fait au Gabon en 1856 et en 1857 par M. Henry C. Deyrolle sous les auspices de MM. le comte de Mniszech et James Thomson. in: Archives Entomologiques, Paris 2: frontispiece + 472 p., 14 pls.
1859 Physis: Arcana naturae, ou recueil d'histoire naturelle. Paris, chez J.-B. Baillière et Fils, 1859. Frontispiece by Hercule Nicolet
1860-1861 Essai d'une classification de la famille des Cérambycides et matériaux pour servir à une monographie de cette famille, Paris 
1864 Thomson, J. 1864. Systema Cerambycidarum ou exposé de tous les genres compris dans la famille des cérambycides et familles limitrophes. in: Mémoires de la Société royale des sciences de Liège, 19: 1–540.
1877 Typi cerambycidarum Musei Thomsoniani, Paris, Deyrolle

References
 Arturo Munoz Cuevas, 2006  Hercule Nicolet, épisodes redécouverts d'une vie d'artiste naturaliste au XIXème siecle Bol. Soc. Entom. Aragonesa no. 39 (2006);

External links
 BHL  Archives entomologiques, ou recueil contenant des illustrations d'insectes nouveaux ou rares, par James Thomson
BHL Physis: Arcana naturae, ou recueil d'histoire naturelle

American entomologists
French entomologists
1897 deaths
1828 births
American expatriates in France
Coleopterists